Sherman is an unincorporated community in Wexford County in the U.S. state of Michigan. It was one of the earliest permanent settlements in Wexford County and was the first county seat.

Geography
Sherman is located at the point where four townships meet and portions lie within each of the townships. It is at the northwest corner of Antioch Township, the southwest corner of Hanover Township, the southeast corner of Wexford Township, and the northeast corner of Springville Township. It is situated on M-37 near where it crosses the Manistee River, just a couple miles northeast of the village of Mesick.

History
The first known permanent white settler in the county, B. W. Hall, settled near Sherman in the early 1860s. A store was opened in 1867 and was at first known as Manistee Bridge because of proximity to the bridge over the Manistee River on the Newaygo  and Northport State Road (built in 1857 and is approximately the route of present-day M-37 in the county) which connected Newaygo  to the south with Northport on the Leelanau Peninsula  to the north. The road opened the area for settlement, as it was previously practically inaccessible.  The settlement gained a post office in 1868 named Sherman, after the Civil War General William T. Sherman. Sherman was platted in 1869 and incorporated as a village in 1887. Fires destroyed the business district and the village disincorporated sometime in the 1920s.

Sherman was the county seat until 1881, when, as a result of the so-called "Battle of Sherman", the seat was moved first to Manton and a short time later to Cadillac.

References

Further reading
Michigan Place Names, by Walter Romig, L.H.D., Wayne State University Press: 1986  (hardbound)  (softbound)
Wexford County Fact Sheet B2 History
Wexford County Fact Book B2 History
Chapter XVII Wexford County in A history of northern Michigan and its people by Perry F. Powers ; assisted by H.G. Cutler. Powers, Perry Francis, 1857-1945. Chicago: Lewis Publishing Co., 1912. p. 404

External links
First Wexford County Courthouse Michigan Historical Marker

Unincorporated communities in Wexford County, Michigan
Former villages in Michigan
Unincorporated communities in Michigan
1867 establishments in Michigan
Populated places established in 1867
Former county seats in Michigan